Eskenazi may refer to

People
 Anthony Eskenzi, British politician
 Giuseppe Eskenazi (born 1939), London oriental art dealer
 Jason Eskenazi (born 1960), American photographer
 Roza Eskenazi (1890s–1980), Greek singer
 Sergio Esquenazi (born 1974), Argentinian filmmaker
 Stephen Eskinazi (born 1994), British cricketer
 Tamara Cohn Eskenazi, American scholar and rabbi

Other
 Eskenazi (art gallery), London
 Eskenazi Museum of Art, Bloomington, Indiana, U.S.
 Sidney & Lois Eskenazi Hospital, Indianapolis, Indiana, U.S.
 Eskenazi Health Art Collection